My Favorite Clown is a 1986 Soviet drama film directed by Yuri Kushneryov.

Plot 
The film tells about a young clown who adopts an orphanage in spite of all circumstances.

Cast 
 Oleg Menshikov as Sergei Sinitsin
 Ilya Tyurin
 Vladimir Ilyin as Roman
 Tatyana Dogileva	
 Natalya Sayko
 Oleg Strizhenov		
 Archil Gomiashvili
 Olga Bityukova
 Lionella Pyryeva
 Yevgeny Gavrilin

References

External links 
 

1986 films
1980s Russian-language films
Soviet drama films
1986 drama films
Films with screenplays by Nikita Mikhalkov